William Thompson Walters (May 23, 1820 – November 22, 1894) was an American businessman and art collector, whose collection formed the basis of the Walters Art Museum.

Early life and education
Walters was born on the Juniata River in Liverpool, Pennsylvania on May 23, 1820.  He was the son of the Scotch-Irish banker Henry Walters.

Walters studied civil engineering at the University of Pennsylvania.

Career
While educated as a civil engineer, he became interested in the coal and iron industry.  While directing a smelting establishment in Lycoming County, Pennsylvania, Walters produced the first iron manufactured from mineral coal in the United States.

In 1841, he moved to Baltimore, where he worked as a grain merchant and, in 1847, became a liquor wholesaler by establishing the importing firm of William T. Walters & Co.

He spent much of the American Civil War in Europe, where he studied and purchased art. After the end of the war, he returned to the United States, where he invested in banking and railroads, founding the Atlantic Coast Line. He was appointed as the United States commissioner at the Paris expositions of 1867 and 1878, and also to that at Vienna in 1873.  In the late 1880s, he took in business in the horse trade, importing Percheron horses with his partner Samuel Hopkins.

With his success in business secured, Walters turned to art collection, purchasing contemporary American and European works. During the American Civil War, he took his wife to Europe and lived in Paris. (Their children were in boarding school in the US part of the time.) They traveled widely in Europe, where Walters cultivated his interest in art, and purchased numerous additions for his collection.

In addition to contemporary European work, Walters began to collect Asian art and ceramics.  His private collection became one of the largest and most valuable in the United States.

From 1874 onwards, Walters opened his house in Mount Vernon Place to the public most springs, with a 50 cent entrance fee; all proceeds went to charity. This annual exhibit of his gallery netted $30,000 for the poor of Baltimore.

Brayton Ives, a New York financier, made a well known collection of rare and historical swords. When he ceased collecting, the historical swords were sold, and through the efforts of Mr. Heber R. Bishop, William Thompson Walters and the American Art Association, the valuable sword collection, valued at $15,000, was donated to the Metropolitan Museum of Art.

At his death in 1894, Walters had bequeathed his estate, estimated at $10,000,000, to his children.  His collection was left to his son Henry Walters, who had also been collecting art.  He added to it greatly, and founded the Walters Gallery (now the Walters Art Museum) in Baltimore at Mount Vernon Square. He donated this to the city of Baltimore at his death in 1931 for the benefit of the public.

Personal life

In 1846, Walters married Ellen Harper (1822–1862), daughter of a prosperous Philadelphia merchant and his wife. Together, they were the parents of two children that survived to adulthood, a son and daughter: 

 Henry Walters (1848–1931), who married Sarah Wharton Green (1859–1943), the widow of Pembroke Jones, in 1922.
 Jennie Walters (1853–1922), who married Warren Delano (1852–1920), a son of Warren Delano Jr. and a brother of Frederic Adrian Delano and Sara Ann Delano Roosevelt, in 1876.

Ellen died young of pneumonia, contracted when they were traveling in England, in 1862.  Walters lived another thirty-two years until his death on November 22, 1894 at his home, Mount Vernon Place in Baltimore.  He was buried at Green Mount Cemetery, also in Baltimore.

Works
Among his writings are:
 Barye (1885)
 Notes Upon Certain Masters of the 19th Century (1886)

References

External links

 
 "The History of the Walters Art Museum" at Walters Art Museum

1820 births
1894 deaths
19th-century American businesspeople
American art collectors
American philanthropists
American railway entrepreneurs
Businesspeople from Baltimore
Philanthropists from Maryland
University of Pennsylvania alumni